An amber moon is a cocktail containing Tabasco sauce, a raw egg, and whiskey or vodka. It is typically considered a "hair of the dog" hangover remedy (an alcoholic drink consumed for the purpose of relieving a hangover), though there is no scientific evidence showing that drinking alcohol is effective as a treatment for a hangover. It is similar to a prairie oyster, another traditional hangover remedy drink made with a raw egg, though a prairie oyster does not typically contain alcohol.

The amber moon is featured in the 1974 mystery film Murder on the Orient Express, based on the 1934 novel by Agatha Christie. In the film, the butler Mr. Edward Beddoes, played by John Gielgud, brings this drink in the morning to his employer, Mr. Samuel Ratchett, just prior to the discovery of the murder. Beddoes knocks on the door of the dead man's train compartment and announces, "It's me sir, Beddoes, with your pick-me-up. Your Amber Moon, Mr. Ratchett." Beddoes is later questioned about the death of Ratchett, later revealed to be vile child murderer Lanfranco Cassetti, by the detective Hercule Poirot and relates, "His breakfast was his Amber Moon. He never rose until it had had its full effect." The amber moon in the film was prepared with vodka instead of whisky.

Clark Gable makes himself an amber moon in the movie Comrade X.

An amber moon is also prepared for Pubert in the movie Addams Family Values.

Warren Beatty consumes this drink several times as the leading man of the 1971 western McCabe and Mrs. Miller.

An amber moon can also be seen in the streaming television series Russian Doll.

See also
 List of cocktails

References

Cocktails with whisky
Cocktails with vodka
Spicy cocktails